Surrey-Panorama Ridge was a provincial electoral district for the Legislative Assembly of British Columbia, Canada from 2001 to 2009. The district was created in the 1999 redistribution from the southern half of Surrey-Newton, and the western portion of Surrey-Cloverdale. It was abolished following the 2008 redistribution, with a large portion going to the new Surrey-Panorama riding.

Demographics

Members of the Legislative Assembly 
This riding has elected the following Members of Legislative Assembly:

Election results 

|-
 
|NDP
|Jagrup Brar
|align="right"|11,553
|align="right"|53.17
|align="right"|-0.42

|-

|- bgcolor="white"
!align="left" colspan=3|Total
!align="right"|21,730
!align="right"|100.00
!align="right"|
|}

|-
 
|NDP
|Jagrup Brar
|align="right"|6,740
|align="right"|53.59
|align="right"|+33.68

|-

|Independent
|Joe Pal
|align="right"|68
|align="right"|0.54
|align="right"|–
|- bgcolor="white"
!align="right" colspan=3|Total Valid Votes
!align="right"|12,577
!align="right"|100.00
!align="right"|
|- bgcolor="white"
!align="right" colspan=3|Total Rejected Ballots
!align="right"|41
!align="right"|0.33
!align="right"|
|- bgcolor="white"
!align="right" colspan=3|Turnout
!align="right"|12,618
!align="right"|52.15
!align="right"|
|}

|-

|-
 
|NDP
|Bruce Ralston
|align="right"|3,240
|align="right"|19.91
|align="right"|–

|- bgcolor="white"
!align="right" colspan=3|Total Valid Votes
!align="right"|16,272
!align="right"|100.00
!align="right"|
|- bgcolor="white"
!align="right" colspan=3|Total Rejected Ballots
!align="right"|128
!align="right"|0.79
!align="right"|
|- bgcolor="white"
!align="right" colspan=3|Turnout
!align="right"|16,400
!align="right"|69.04
!align="right"|
|}

References

External links 
BC Stats - 2001
2001 Expenditures (pdf)
Website of the Legislative Assembly of British Columbia
Jagrup Brar biography

Former provincial electoral districts of British Columbia
Politics of Surrey, British Columbia